The Catholic Church in Jamaica is part of the worldwide Catholic Church, under the spiritual leadership of the Pope in Rome.

There are about 50,000 (2%) Catholics in Jamaica, which is divided into three dioceses, including one archdiocese:
 Archdiocese of Kingston
 Diocese of Mandeville
 Diocese of Montego Bay

The Missionaries of the Poor monastic order originated in Kingston, Jamaica.

References

 
Jamaica